Choi Go is a South Korean child actor and model. He is known for his roles in dramas such as Nobody Knows, My Country: The New Age, and Her Private Life. He is best known for his role in the drama Into the Ring as Kim Ja-ryong.

Filmography

Television series

Film

Awards and nominations

References

External links
 
 

2012 births
Living people
People from Cheongju
21st-century South Korean male actors
South Korean male television actors
South Korean male child actors
South Korean male film actors
South Korean male models